Return to Flight can refer to:

 Apollo 7, NASA's first mission after the Apollo 1 fire
 Apollo 14, NASA's first mission after the failure of Apollo 13
 Falcon 9 Flight 20
 Space Shuttle mission STS-26, NASA's first mission after the Space Shuttle Challenger disaster
 Space Shuttle mission STS-114, NASA's first test mission after the Space Shuttle Columbia disaster
 Space Shuttle mission STS-121, NASA's second test mission following the Columbia disaster
 ISRO's successful launch of GSLV-D5 with indigenously developed CE-7.5 cryogenic rocket engine